Jean-Pierre Smith may refer to:
 JP Smith (rugby union), a South African rugby union player.
 Jean-Pierre Smith (politician), Cape Town city councillor.